Horace Prince (21 October 1900 – 5 May 1977) was a New Zealand cricketer. He played in two first-class matches for Wellington from 1923 to 1925.

See also
 List of Wellington representative cricketers

References

External links
 

1900 births
1977 deaths
New Zealand cricketers
Wellington cricketers
Cricketers from Napier, New Zealand